George Hope may refer to:

 George Johnstone Hope (1767–1818), British naval officer
 George Hope (American football), head college football coach for the University of Richmond Spiders
 George Hope (Royal Navy officer) (1869–1959), Deputy First Sea Lord during World War I
 George Hope (footballer, born 1954), English footballer
 George Hope (Australian footballer) (1891–1964), Australian rules footballer
 George William Hope (1808–1863), British Member of Parliament for Windsor